Theillay is a commune of the Loir-et-Cher department in central France.

Geography
The Rère flows west through the northern part of the commune.

Population

See also
Communes of the Loir-et-Cher department

References

Communes of Loir-et-Cher